Kennedy Boateng may refer to:

 Kennedy Boateng (footballer, born 1989), Ghanaian football player
 Kennedy Boateng (footballer, born 1996), Ghanaian football player